Bassadewitz is an old German card game for 4 players that is still played today. It is a member of the Hearts family of games.

History 
The game is also called Passadewitz, Bassarowitz, Passarowitz, Passorowiss or Bassarowiz. It is recorded as early as 1729 in a humorous poem, Das schöne Spiel Bassarowiz, which describes it as a "much vaunted game".
It is first recorded in the 1811 in Hammer's die deutschen Kartenspiele and is still played as a family game in parts of German-speaking Europe. It is a member of the trick avoidance group of playing cards.

Playing 
Dealer puts up a pool of twelve counters and deals eight cards each from a 32-card pack of French or German playing cards ranking and counting as follows:

Eldest hand leads to the first trick and the winner of each trick leads to the next. Suit must be followed if possible. The trick is taken by the highest card of the suit led. There are no trumps.

Scoring 
Whoever takes the fewest card points wins 5 counters, second fewest 4, third fewest 3. Ties are settled in favour of the eldest player, but a player taking no tricks beats one who merely takes no card points.

A player winning every trick is paid 4 counters each by the others and a player taking 100 or more in card points, but failing to win every trick, pays 4 each to the other players. In these cases, the pool remains intact and the same dealer deals again, as also if all four take the same number of card points.

Variant 
The Ace may count 5 points instead of 11, and players adds 1 point per trick to their total of card points, which may be classified as the easiest form of playing the game

References

Literature 
 _ (1983). "Bassadewitz". In: Spielkartenfabrik Altenburg (publ.): Erweitertes Spielregelbüchlein aus Altenburg, Verlag Altenburger Spielkartenfabrik, Leipzig 1983, pp. 41ff
 
 
 Bassadewitz in Brockhaus' Konversationslexikon, 14th edition, 1894–1896, Vol. 2, p. 472
 Parlett, David (2008). The Penguin Book of Card Games. London: Penguin (2008). p. 157. .
 Grupp, Claus D. Karten-spiele, Niederhausen: Falken (1975/1979),  p. 47. .
 Heinrici, Christian Friedrich (1732). Ernst-Schertzhaffte und Satyrische Gedichte: Mit Kupffern, Volume 3. Leipzig: Joh. Theod. Boetiiseel. The poem is dated 1729.

Trick-avoidance games
German card games
French deck card games
German deck card games